GHDs or GHDS may refer to:

 Guitar Hero: On Tour series for the Nintendo DS
 Hair straightening irons, especially by Good Hair Day